Commitments is a drama film released in 2001 on television by BET.  The movie stars Allen Payne and  Victoria Dillard, focusing on the relationship that grows between Fox Giovanni (Dillard) and Van Compton (Payne).

External links
 

2001 drama films
2001 films
African-American drama films
2000s English-language films
2000s American films